The following are the national records in track cycling in Malaysia maintained by Malaysian National Cycling Federation (MNCF):

Men

Women

Junior Men (under 19)

Junior Women (under 19)

References

External links
 MNCF website

Records
Malaysia
Track cycling
track cycling